20 Comedy Hits is a collection of previously recorded songs by Ray Stevens, released in 1995. The first, third, fourth and fifth tracks were included through the courtesy of Barnaby Records, for whom Stevens recorded during the early seventies. The selection of "Shriner's Convention" is a live version that was taken from the album Ray Stevens Live! "Gitarzan" is the album version that begins with audience noises, and "Ahab the Arab" is a re-recording of his 1962 hit for his album Gitarzan (released in 1969). The remaining tracks are selections that were recorded for Curb Records; of these selections, only two were released as singles ("Super Cop" and "The Motel Song") and the rest served as album cuts. The sixth to ninth tracks were taken from the album Classic Ray Stevens, the tenth to thirteenth tracks from #1 With a Bullet, and the last seven from Lend Me Your Ears. Overall, it is not completely accurate to include the word "hits" in the title of this compilation, as it contains only seven songs that were previously released as singles and five of the seven made true impact on the charts.

Inside the album cover is an essay by Barry Alfonso that covers Stevens' life and career from his year of birth to the time of the release of this collection.

Track listing

Album credits
All tracks except "Gitarzan" were produced and arranged by: Ray Stevens
"Gitarzan" was produced and arranged by: Ray Stevens, Fred Foster and Jim Malloy
Art Direction and Design: Neuman, Walker + Assoc.
Illustration: Jill VonHartmann
Album Coordination: Sarita Martin

Compiled from liner notes.

References

1995 compilation albums
Ray Stevens compilation albums
Curb Records compilation albums